Supa Strikas is an animated television series about the super league's greatest football team based on the pan-African football (soccer) themed comic of the same name, which is produced in Malaysia by Animasia Studio, and Strika Entertainment originally in South Africa.

The animated show is broadcast in South Africa and across South East Asia and Latin America, with a broadcasting reach of over a million viewers per episode in South Africa.

Plot 
In their bid to raise the Super League trophy (equivalent to the FIFA Club World Cup), the world's greatest soccer team, Supa Strikas, must adventure through the world of soccer. Supa Strikas explore the roots of the game (from Mexico to Japan and other countries), meet its greatest players (past and present) and confront its most unscrupulous coaches and players. Shakes has a rival "Skarra" who him and his Coach try everything to sabotage the Strikas on their upcoming game.

Shakes, the Supa Strikas' youngest striker, is believed to be one of the best strikers in the world.  But for Shakes and his teammates, being the best is only the beginning. The game's global legacy and the players who dream of being crowned Super League champs mean Shakes must constantly challenge himself to remain in contention. As a result, he often finds himself spearheading the team's exploration of the unknown – be it a strange land, a strange opposition or a new soccer challenge.

Characters
There are 10 main players in the team and their coach:
Coach (Coach) - Being the team's coach, he is amoung the most serious characters in the series. Coach tends to be very controlling of his team, and is very strict. All the Strikas appear to fear him due to his short temper, but all of whom respect him. Despite being very strict, Coach is also very nice to his team and often forgives them for their mistakes. Coach is very passionate about his team, so much so, that in the episode "Wolf in Coach's Clothes", he was taken to the hospital due to his stress levels stadily rising after his team struggled to win. In the episode "Training Daze", Coach was furious with his team after their performance against Invincible United, going as far as torment and punish them with a series of difficult challenges (even creating a robot). His main rival is the series is Invincible United's coach, Vince. In Season 2, it was revealed that Coach previously played for Supa Strikas as number 11, and was considered one of the greatest players in the Super League. In Season 7, It is revealed that Coach has a history with Shakes' father.
 Shakes (Striker, Main Character) - Shakes is the main character of the series and the team's youngest player and star striker from South Africa. He inherits the number 10 jersey from his father, Jomo, who is considered one of the greatest players in the Super League. He is a fair and honest player, and is notable for investigating and discovering the opposition's team's nefarious plot. He is always willing to help his teams, and often goes through a lot of trouble to help them. Shakes is one of the best strikers in the Super League, and the commentators Brenda and Mac have referred to him as Supa Strikas' star striker. His signature moves include the Knuckle Ball, he practiced the move in the Season 3 episode, "Shakes On A Train," and in the episode, the move seemed to be unstoppable. Another signature move is the "Bicycle Kick," he learned this move from his father, when he was a child. Shakes uses the move very effectively and in the finale(s) of Season 1, 2, and 3, Shakes used the move to score the winning goal (two of which where in the Super League Final). Shakes also seems to be the most determined player in his team to win the Super League Trophy, and is always interested in improving his play and skills. Shakes has many rivals in the series, one of the most notable is Johann Uber (from Iron Tank) who has injured Shakes on a number of occasions, Shakes also appeared to be scared of him in the episode "The End of Dreams", even having nightmares about him. Shakes' main rival in the series, is Skarra. The two really dislike each other, which is even known in the public. In many encounters between Supa Strikas and Invincible United, including episodes like "Super Skarra" and "Shakes on a Train" the public and the fans were anticipating the rivalry between the two. Skarra doesn't like being compared to Shakes. In Season 7, the relationship between the two is explored more, particularly in "Food for Thought," when Skarra was unable to play whilst Shakes was on the bench. Coach claimed that with Shakes on the bench, Skarra didn't have a reason to play. Shakes' best friend is Spenza, he is more than willing to help Shakes and the team uncover the opposition team's nefarious plots.
 El Matador (Striker) - El Matador is Shakes' striking partner from Spain who wears the number 20 jersey. El Matador is the most expensive player in the Supa League and the wealthiest player in the team. With this, is incredibly self-absorbed and seems obsessed with the spotlight, this is greatly seen in the Season 6 episode "Living the El Life," where started his own reality TV show. El Matador tends to be very selfish, which is seen in "No El in Team", when he takes a shot himself, despite both Shakes and Cool Joe being open to score. He also overprotective his aqua sunglasses and is very strict about his teammates touching them. El Matador is very reliant on his fans, and apparently is unable to play in empty stadium with no fans, and in the episode "Last Action Figure" is unable to play well when fans are against him. He is also obsessed with a luxurious lifestyle and in the episode "Cheer and Loafing in Las Vegas," he states that he "needs the best, to play [his] best". Despite these qualities, El Matador states that nothing means more to him than Supa Strikas. El Matador is very skilled as a player, he is capable of scoring goals in almost every scenario. El Matador can score with headers, long range and close range shots, and has also scored with a bicycle kick. Despite being melodramatic, he is also very intelligent in outsmarting defenders. He is a very consistent goalscorer (in Season 5 alone, he scored multiple hat-tricks) and is one of the best players in the Super League. El Matador's main rival in the series is Ninja, from Cosmos F.C., and the two share many similarities including their obsession with luxury and celebrity lifestyle.
 Dancing Rasta (Midfielder, Captain) - Dancing Rasta is the Jamacian captain of Supa Strikas, he wears the number 9 jersey and a seasoned mountaineer. He plays as a midfielder, and is praised by commentators and his own teammates for his effiicent leadership skills and brillant passes. Most fans believe he is the best captain in the Super League. He is very motivational, and is capable of his inspiring his team to pull through difficult challenges with motivational speeches, this was mostly seen in "Pitch Imperfect" and "The Crunch". 
 Big Bo (Goal Keeper, Vice Captain) - Big Bo is the main goalkeeper of the team and vice captain. He wears the number 1 jersey and is often claimed to be the best goalkeeper in the Super League, even better than De Los Santos. He is from Middletown, Texas, in the United States, and Supa Strikas is his third team. He has won many awards as a goalkeeper. Before joining Supa Strikas, he accidentally injured Grimm F.C. legend Spike "Awesome" Dawson out of his soccer career. Spike refused to accept Big Bo's apology and has since become obsessed with revenge. In the episode "Spirit of the Occasion", it is revealed that Big Bo at one point injured his hand during dive and his hand hit the post, and subsequently this became his weak spot. He hesitates to drive to the left due to the injury, therefore one in every three shots to his left results in a goal. At the end of the episode, it appeared as though Big Bo had overcome this weakness.
 North Shaw (Main Defender)
 Blok (Defender) -
 Cool Joe (Midfielder, Left Winger) - Cool Joe is a Brazilian left wing midfielder who wears the number 7 jersey. He is known as the "king of crossing" due to his excellent crosses. He is also known for his spins, which help the strikers score many goals. In the Season 1 episode "Cool Joe Loses His Groove", it is revealed that Cool Joe has a flair for disco music, crediting one record for his "groove" during matches. It also revealed that he relies on the "groove" of this record to perform well, but when evil opposition coach Toni Vern switched the record, Cool Joe was unable to perform well and was visible confused while playing. He also own a disco club known as Cool Joe's.
 Twisting Tiger (Midfielder, Right Winger) - Twisting Tiger is a right-footed winger and midfielder from Japan who wears the number 16 jersey. He previously played for Nakama F.C., and learnt Japanese football style from former coach Ura Giri. His former teammate, Miko Chen from Nakama F.C., is like a brother to him. Ura Giri turned against Twisting Tiger after his decision to leave Nakama. Tiger is known for his signature move, the Twisting Tonado, as well as his accurate shooting. In Season 5, he began a variation of the Twisting Tornado, but with his hands (it can be referred to as the upside Twisting Tornado). He is one of the fastest players in the Super League and is one of the best players in Supa Strikas. He believes his lucky charm helps Supa Strikas during matches. He began wearing bandages on his arm, following an encounter with Colosus F.C., where he was arm was injured and Niko Chen injured his legs.
 Klaus (Striker)
 Eagle eye (Defender)

Origins 
The Supa Strikes was originally based on the Harambee Stars football team, which is the official football team of Kenya. The character of "Coach " is based on a reputable Kenyan coach called Ghost Mulee.
Odongo and Makena are famous Kenyan footballers.

Production 
The series was produced by Strika Entertainment, a South African-based comics and animation production studio until 2019, when the entire franchise was acquired by Moonbug Entertainment.

Release 
It is broadcast in all Supa Strikas territories. In South Africa season one was previously broadcast on SABC 1 and SABC 2 until the rights were taken over by e.tv which is yet to broadcast the latest season which is currently on Disney XD and Cartoon Network (Africa), across South east Asia on STAR Sports Asia and Disney Channel Asia, in Zambia on ZNBC, in Panama on TVMax and across Latin America on ESPN Latin America. Meanwhile, in India and Pakistan, Supa Strikas can also be seen on Sonic-Nickelodeon and Nick HD+. in Canada on Citytv, in Chile on Canal 13, in Morocco on 2M TV, in France on Orange and Canal+, in Qatar on JeemTV, in Malaysia on Disney XD Asia and TV2 (previously on TV3 and TV9), in Hungary on TV2, in the Philippines on ABS-CBN and Studio 23 (now ABS-CBN Sports+Action) and in Poland on ZigZap , Teletoon+ , TVP ABC and Disney XD in Turkey and the United Kingdom on Pluto TV, in Portugal on SIC K and in Singapore on Mediacorp Suria. And soon to be telecast again on Hungama TV from 21 December 2020 7:30 pm

Spin-Off
On November 23, 2021, Supa Strikas official channel released a trailer of their brand new series titled "Rookie Season". The trailer announced the series release date to be- 3 December 2021. It was said to be a Youtube Original series. It focuses on How Shakes joined Supa Strikas. 
"Rookie Season kicks back to where it all started for Supa Strikas’ youngest star. Join Shakes on a series of misadventures, as he gets betrayed by his best friend, searches for his dad and mystifies his sister, risking everything for one shot at joining the world’s most epic soccer team and raising a little thing called the Super League!"
On December 3rd 2021, Supa Strikas official channel released 6 episodes of "Rookie season." An official date for the rest (7-12) has not been announced. However, the 7th episode of the series was released on April 15, 2022. The 8th episode released on April 22, 2022. With this, many have concluded the series will release the next 4 episodes weekly. The series has officially been made weekly; the 9th episode released on April 29, 2022. Also, 10th and 11th episode was released during starting two weeks of May 2022.

Reception 
The series got 9.1/10 points, rated by IMDB. The series has received criticism for its lack of main female characters.

References

External links
 
 
 Supa Strikas at Strikas Communications
 Supa Strikas Malaysia Website

SABC 1 original programming
2000s animated television series
2010s animated television series
2000s South African television series
2000s Malaysian television series
2010s South African television series
2010s Malaysian television series
Malaysian children's animated television series
South African animated television series
Animated sports television series
Television shows based on comics
Fictional association football television series
Association football animation
Moonbug Entertainment